Friedrich August Saebelmann (26 September 1851, in Karksi, Viljandi County – 3 March 1911, in Paistu, Viljandi County) was an Estonian composer.

He is buried at Paistu Cemetery.

His brother was composer Aleksander Kunileid.

Works

 choral song "Ellerhein"
 choral song "Su priiuse nad olid matnud"
 choral song "Ema süda"
 choral song "Kaunimad laulud" 
 choral song "Jahilaul"
 choral song "Kevade noorus" 
 choral song "Palve"
 solo song "Serenaad"

References

1851 births
1911 deaths
Estonian composers
People from Viljandi County